Alina Gut, née Suska (born 10 February 1938) is a Polish politician. She was elected to Sejm on 25 September 2005, getting 8455 votes in 6 Lublin district as a candidate from the Samoobrona Rzeczpospolitej Polskiej list.

See also
Members of Polish Sejm 2005-2007

External links
Alina Gut - parliamentary page – includes declarations of interest, voting record, and transcripts of speeches.

1938 births
Living people
Politicians from Lublin
Members of the Polish Sejm 2005–2007
Women members of the Sejm of the Republic of Poland
Self-Defence of the Republic of Poland politicians
21st-century Polish women politicians
Maria Curie-Skłodowska University alumni